The 1990–1998 Indonesian military operations in Aceh, also known as Operation Red Net or Military Operation Area was launched in early 1990s until August 22, 1998, against the separatist movement of Free Aceh Movement (GAM) in Aceh. During that period, the Indonesian army practiced large-scale and systematic human rights abuses against the Acehnese. The war was characterised as a "dirty war" involving arbitrary executions, kidnapping, torture, mass rape, disappearances, and the torching of villages. Amnesty International called the military operations response as a "shock therapy" for GAM. Villages that were suspected of harboring GAM operatives were burnt down and family members of suspected militants were kidnapped and tortured. Between 9,000 and 12,000 people, mostly civilians, were killed between 1989 and 1998 in the operation.

See also 
 Insurgency in Aceh

References

External links 
INDONESIA: "SHOCK THERAPY": RESTORING ORDER IN ACEH 1989-1993 
Indonesia: The War in Aceh

Military operations involving Indonesia
History of Aceh
20th-century conflicts
Insurgency in Aceh
Insurgencies in Asia
Separatism in Indonesia
Wars involving Indonesia
New Order (Indonesia)
Post-Suharto era